Acacia vincentii is a shrub of the genus Acacia and the subgenus Plurinerves that is endemic to an area of north western Australia.

Description
Like most species of Acacia it has phyllodes rather than true leaves. The ascending to erect, thinly leathery and evergreen phyllodes have an inequilaterally oblong-oblanceolate shape with rounded upper margin. It blooms in August and produces yellow flowers.

Distribution
It is native to an area in the Kimberley region of Western Australia where it is commonly situated on sandstone plateaux in shallow sandy soils. It has a limited range and is confined to the Edkins Range.

See also
List of Acacia species

References

vincentii
Acacias of Western Australia
Taxa named by Bruce Maslin
Taxa named by Richard Sumner Cowan
Plants described in 1990